Cecilie Breil Kramer (née Sørensen; born 25 March 1987) is a Danish football goalkeeper. She played for Vittsjö GIK of the Damallsvenskan and the Denmark national team.

Club career

In 2014 B.93/HIK/Skjold went into meltdown when the entire squad quit en masse in protest at the club's feckless leadership. Breil Kramer soon pitched up at Brøndby IF.

International career
She was called up to be part of the national team for the UEFA European Championship 2013.

Personal life
In summer 2014 Breil Kramer married Maria in Solrød. She was wearing a plaster cast with her wedding dress.

Honours

Club
BK Skjold
Winner
 Kvinde 1. division: 2011–12

Runner-up
 Danish Women's Cup: 2011–12

References

External links
 
 
 Profile at soccerdonna.de 
 
 Profile at dbu.dk 

1987 births
Living people
Danish women's footballers
Denmark women's international footballers
Danish expatriate men's footballers
Expatriate women's footballers in Sweden
Damallsvenskan players
Brøndby IF (women) players
Vittsjö GIK players
LGBT association football players
Women's association football goalkeepers
Danish LGBT sportspeople
Ballerup-Skovlunde Fodbold (women) players
21st-century Danish LGBT people
Association football goalkeepers